The OFC Professional League is a planned association football league slated to begin play in 2025, under the auspices of the Oceania Football Confederation. It will consist of clubs from different nations throughout the region.

History
In 2019 the Oceania Football Confederation formed a task force to determine the viability of a professional football league for the Oceania region. The league was originally expected to begin play in 2021. However, progress was slowed by the COVID-19 pandemic.

About the project, OFC President Lambert Maltock said the league would play a crucial role in elevating the sport throughout Oceania and that, "As leaders of Oceania football, we are responsible for the growth of football, and we need to move forward to make this happen."

In October 2022 FIFA president Gianni Infantino pledged the organization's full support of the project at the OFC's 28th Ordinary Congress in Auckland, New Zealand. At the event, which doubled as an inauguration ceremony for the new OFC Home of Football headquarters, Infantino said, "FIFA wholeheartedly supports the efforts to create an Oceania professional league, because we need to professionalize the game everywhere across all the islands...There are challenges across all of the islands, and we need to turn these challenges into advantages, in order to create professional football at the top level. We will work for that, and we expect that together with FIFA, all confederations and member associations will provide their support."

On 19 November 2022 in Doha, Qatar, the OFC Executive Committee voted to move forward with the league with a target start date of 2025. Following the announcement, an OFC spokesperson stated that the league was in the "very early stage of planning" and clarified that the new league would not affect the current format of the OFC Champions League.

In February 2023 OFC President Maltock presented an update on the proposed league and emphasized its importance to the growth of the sport in the region. Again, FIFA President Infantino stated, "...I once again pledge FIFA’s full support to help our friends and colleagues in Oceania to make this proposal become a reality."

Format
Originally Papua New Guinea Football Association president John Kapi Natto stated that the league would play a home-and-away, round-robin schedule against clubs from across the confederation's members.

Players
The vision of the league is to create a pathway for Oceania's players to be scouted and join top clubs in Australia, Asia, and Europe. An early roster concept includes composite rosters similar to Super Rugby side Moana Pasifika. The squads would be built upon Oceanian players, with marquee players from other regions featuring.

References

Top level football leagues in Oceania
Oceania Football Confederation competitions